Ross Alexander Munro (born 1 April 2000) is a Scottish professional footballer, who plays as a goalkeeper for Ross County having previously played for Brora Rangers, Cowdenbeath, Annan Athletic and Raith Rovers on loan.

Club career
Born in Inverness, Munro grew up in Nairn. He signed for Ross County at under-15 level after playing for Nairn County. In January 2017, Munro signed a one month development loan with Highland League side Brora Rangers. On 2 February 2017, it was announced that Munro had extended his loan until the end of the season.

On 17 May 2018, it was announced that Munro and three other youth players had signed their first senior professional contracts with Ross County. Munro made his debut for Ross County in the Scottish Challenge Cup against Heart of Midlothian Colts in August 2018 which County won 2-1. He went on to play in every round of the Challenge Cup, including the final as Ross County lifted the trophy beating Connah's Quay Nomads 3–1.

In June 2019, Munro moved on loan to Scottish League One club Raith Rovers until January 2020.

Munro joined Scottish League Two club Cowdenbeath on a 7-day emergency loan on 11 December 2020, and had a loan spell at Annan Athletic later that season. He signed a new one-year contract at the club in June 2021.

In March 2022, Munro signed a new one-year contract with the club.

International career
In October 2018, Munro was called up to the Scotland national under-21 side for a fixture against Ukraine.

Career statistics

Honours
Ross County
Scottish Championship: 2018–19
Scottish Challenge Cup: 2018–19

Raith Rovers
Scottish League One: 2019–20

References

2000 births
Living people
Footballers from Inverness
Scottish footballers
Ross County F.C. players
Raith Rovers F.C. players
Scottish Professional Football League players
Association football goalkeepers
Brora Rangers F.C. players
Highland Football League players